Idaho Legislative District 27 is one of 35 districts of the Idaho Legislature. It is currently represented by Senator Kelly Anthon, Republican of Declo, Representative Scott Bedke, Republican of Oakley, and Representative Fred Wood, Republican of Burley.

District Overview

Party Affiliation

Cities

School Districts
Cassia County Joint School District #151
Minidoka County School District #331

District profile (1992–2002) 
From 1992 to 2002, District 27 consisted of all of Madison County and a portion of Fremont County.

District profile (2002–2012) 
From 2002 to 2012, District 27 consisted of all of Cassia, Power, and Oneida Counties, and a portion of Bingham County.

District profile (2012–present) 
District 27 currently consists of all of Cassia and Minidoka Counties.

See also

 List of Idaho Senators
 List of Idaho State Representatives

References

External links
Idaho Legislative District Map (with members)
Idaho Legislature (official site)

27
Cassia County, Idaho
Minidoka County, Idaho